The Warrior Tour was the second headlining concert tour by American recording artist Kesha, in support of her sophomore studio album, Warrior (2012). The tour started on July 3, 2013, and concluded on September 19, 2015.

Background and development

In late March, Kesha and American rapper Pitbull announced that they would tour North America together on their North American Tour 2013. The joint tour was officially announced on March 22, 2013, but the two hinted at the tour on March 21, 2013, via Twitter. Shortly after tickets were available for the duo's summer tour, Kesha announced a separate tour that would visit Europe and other places she did not visit with Pitbull. The tickets for the European leg of the tour went on-sale shortly after the dates were announced. A couple weeks later, on May 13, 2013, North American dates were added to the tour. Kesha announced the pre-sale password for the North American dates via Twitter after the fourth episode of her television show, Kesha: My Crazy Beautiful Life, aired on May 16, 2013. The tickets went on sale to the general public on May 17, 2013. Leading up to the tour, Kesha has been using the website Mobio Insider to connect with her fans and give them details about the tour. Kesha has been promoting the tour mainly through her Twitter and Facebook accounts.

Aside from the social media promotion, Kesha has also promoted the tour through the application, Blippar. When scanning Kesha's symbol, fans can access many special features including the chance to win tickets to any of the dates on the North American leg. Many of the dates are a part of festivals and fairs including the Live at the Marquee Festival in Cork, Ireland, the Wireless Festival in London, England, the Illinois State Fair in Springfield, Illinois, and a few others.

In October 2014, Kesha brought back the Warrior Tour setlist and costumes to perform for a music festival in Shanghai, China. After that, the tour was revisited and traveled throughout South and North America with new songs, visuals, and costumes added to the tour through January to September 2015.

Broadcasts and recordings
On June 21, 2013, the television network, E!, announced that the network would broadcast a show from one of the co-headlining dates Kesha was on with Pitbull. The show would be broadcast as a part of E!'s Inside Track Summer Concert Series. The series is a collaboration with Live Nation. The network filmed the show in Detroit at The Palace of Auburn Hills on June 7, 2013. The recording was aired as the first installment of the series on June 21, 2013. To promote the broadcasting, E! interviewed Kesha an hour before the show at The Palace of Auburn Hills. In the interview, Kesha conversed with the interviewer about her favorite and least favorite parts of the tour, costumes she wears for the tour, and her golden tooth that she has from an accident at a bar. E! also interviewed Kesha's stage manager, Justin De Meulenaere, before the show. Meulenaere, who is also known as "Boot", is most known for his work with Kesha on her previous concert tour, the Get Sleazy Tour.

Set list
This set list is representative of the performance in Stockholm. It does not represent all concerts for the duration of the tour.

"Warrior"
"Crazy Kids"
"We R Who We R"
"Blow" (contains elements of the Cirkut Remix)
"Dirty Love"
"Gold Trans Am"
"Take It Off" (rock version)
"C'Mon"
"Thinking of You"
"Machine Gun Love"
"Last Goodbye"
"Love Into the Light"
"Supernatural"
"Blah Blah Blah"
"Your Love Is My Drug"
"Tik Tok"
Encore
"Die Young"

Tour dates

Cancelled shows

Notes

References

2013 concert tours
2015 concert tours
Kesha concert tours